Liz Smith may refer to:

 Liz Smith (actress) (1921–2016), English character actress
 Liz Smith (journalist) (1923–2017), American gossip columnist
 Liz Smith (soccer) (born 1975), Canadian soccer player
 Liz Smith (politician) (born 1960), Scottish Conservative Party politician

See also 
Elizabeth Smith (disambiguation)